The Araguaia National Park (Parque Nacional do Araguaia) is a national park located in Tocantins state in the north of Brazil, between 09º51’—11º11’S and 49º57’—50º27’W. Bananal Island, on which the park is located, is believed to be the largest inland river island in the world.

History
The Araguaia National Park was created on 31 December 1959 by federal decree number 45,570. The whole island is a nature and culture preserve, enacted on 19 December 1973 by Article 28 of the Statute of Indian Law No. 6001.

Geography
The park forms part of the large river island of Bananal Island in the Araguaia River in the southwest of the state of Tocantins, in Brazil. It is situated at the junction of the Amazon biome to the north and the grassland and stunted woodland biome to the south; the river is subject to large fluctuations in level and the park is subject to periodic flooding. The flora consists of a mixture of savannah grassland, scrub and deciduous forest. Rainfall is most frequent between November and March and the hottest time of year is during September and October.
The park would be in the proposed South Amazon Ecotones Ecological Corridor.

Flora
There are piassava palms and buriti palms in parts of the park that are frequently inundated. In the forested areas some frequently encountered  species include the cow tree, Cabralea, Tabebuia, Qualea parviflora, black sweetwood and genipap. In the drier savannah part of the park there are many species of grasses, with scattered trees such as the souari nut tree and the pau-d'alho.

Fauna
There is a wide range of mammals in the park including marsh deer, other species of deer, peccary, capybara, giant anteater, maned wolf, jaguar, giant otter and armadillo. The reptiles present include the anaconda, spectacled caiman, black caiman and South American river turtle, and the rivers are home to many freshwater fish as well as Amazon river dolphins and Tucuxi dolphins. There are plenty of birds too, including the common toucan, anhinga, greater rhea, quail, partridge, osprey, Orinoco goose, heron. egret, Spix's macaw, hoatzin and musician wren.

References

Sources

National parks of Brazil
Protected areas of Tocantins